Nereid Lake is the trapezoidal lake 450 m long in west-southwest to east-northeast direction and 90 m wide in the eastern part of Flamingo Beach on the north coast of Greenwich Island in the South Shetland Islands, Antarctica. It has a surface area of 3.8 ha and is separated from the waters of Orión Passage by a 20 to 40 m wide strip of land. The area was visited by early 19th century sealers.

The feature is named after the Nereids, sea nymphs of Greek mythology.

Location
Bulgarian mapping in 2009 and 2017.

Maps
 L. Ivanov. Antarctica: Livingston Island and Greenwich, Robert, Snow and Smith Islands. Scale 1:120000 topographic map. Troyan: Manfred Wörner Foundation, 2009. 
 L. Ivanov. Antarctica: Livingston Island and Smith Island. Scale 1:100000 topographic map. Manfred Wörner Foundation, 2017. 
 Antarctic Digital Database (ADD). Scale 1:250000 topographic map of Antarctica. Scientific Committee on Antarctic Research (SCAR). Since 1993, regularly upgraded and updated

See also
 Antarctic lakes

Notes

References
 Nereid Lake. SCAR Composite Gazetteer of Antarctica
 Bulgarian Antarctic Gazetteer. Antarctic Place-names Commission. (details in Bulgarian, basic data in English)

External links
 Nereid Lake. Adjusted Copernix satellite image

Lakes of the South Shetland Islands
Bulgaria and the Antarctic